The Catshuis (English: Cats House), initially known as Huis Sorgvliet (Sorgvliet House), is the official residence of the Prime Minister of the Netherlands. Built between 1651 and 1652 for Jacob Cats as private villa, it was renamed after him after his death.

The Catshuis lies in The Hague on the road to Scheveningen. It has been the official residence of the Prime Minister of the Netherlands since 1963, although Dries van Agt was the last premier to live there. Prime Ministers since then have preferred to live in their own homes, such as the current Prime Minister Mark Rutte, who lives in a flat in the centre of The Hague, closer to his official office, the Torentje in the Binnenhof complex. The Catshuis residence is mainly used to house political meetings and receive official guests.

History
As Huis Sorgvliet it was built on the site of a former farm, probably part of the living quarters were incorporated in the left wing, by Jacob Cats (1577–1660), a prominent poet and politician who lived there from 14 July 1652. Originally it had only one storey.

In 1675 estate Sorgvliet came into the possession of Hans Willem Bentinck, chamberlain of the future King-Stadholder William III (1650–1702). His son, Willem Bentinck, had a bronze bell and tower installed in 1738.

To conform with modern norms of security, logistics, climatisation, hygiene, comfort and technical aspects of management, it was extensively renovated from 1999 to 2004.

Sources
Introductiedossier Ministerie van Algemene Zaken (in Dutch): Catshuis

Official residences in the Netherlands
Prime ministerial residences